André Gaulin (born July 5, 1936) is a Quebec politician, he previously served as the member for Taschereau in the Quebec National Assembly as a member of the Parti Québécois from 1994 until 1998.

Biography
He obtained a bachelor's degree in pedagogy, a bachelor's degree in catechesis, a bachelor's degree in history and a diploma from the Ecole normale supérieure in Paris. a master's degree in letters from Université Laval and a doctorate from the Université de Sherbrooke.

Gaulin went on to teach in elementary, high school and college, becoming a professor at Université Laval.

President of the professors' union of École normale de Laval from 1968 to 1970 and then became President of le Association québécoise des professeurs de français from 1970 to 1972, he was the founding Co-President of the Mouvement Québec français in 1970 and member of its executive committee.

Political career

Gaulin ran in the 1994 Quebec provincial election for the seat of Taschereau and won handily serving as a backbench supporter of the Jacques Parizeau and Lucien Bouchard governments. He did not run again in the 1998 Quebec provincial election.

Career after politics

Gaulin was appointed Professor emeritus at Université Laval in June 2001. Vice-President of the Association of Members of the Ordre des Palmes Académiques, Québec chapter, in 2003, and then became president in 2004.

Awards

He received the honour of Chevalier of le Ordre des Palmes Académiques by France in 1985, promoted to Officer in 1996 and Commander in 2006. In 2000, he was awarded the bronze medal by the Société nationale des québécois de la capital, and the Prix Georges-Émile-Lapalme in 2003.

Electoral Record

Provincial

References 

1936 births
Living people
Academics in Quebec
Canadian educators
Commandeurs of the Ordre des Palmes Académiques
École Normale Supérieure alumni
French Quebecers
Parti Québécois MNAs
Politicians from Quebec City
Trade unionists from Quebec
Université Laval alumni
Academic staff of Université Laval
Université de Sherbrooke alumni
20th-century Canadian politicians